Debbie Pratt (born 18 February 1969) is a British former alpine skier who competed in the 1992 Winter Olympics.

References

1969 births
Living people
British female alpine skiers
Olympic alpine skiers of Great Britain
Alpine skiers at the 1992 Winter Olympics
Place of birth missing (living people)